Mahmudabad Rural District is in Tazeh Kand District of Parsabad County, Ardabil province, Iran. At the census of 2006, its population was 5,579 in 1,169 households; there were 5,525 inhabitants in 1,361 households at the following census of 2011; and in the most recent census of 2016, the population of the rural district was 4,615 in 1,303 households. The largest of its 10 villages was Mahmudabad-e Taleqani, with 2,060 people.

References 

Parsabad County

Rural Districts of Ardabil Province

Populated places in Ardabil Province

Populated places in Parsabad County